Events from the year 1483 in Ireland.

Incumbent
Lord: Edward IV (until 9 April), Edward V (9 April to 26 June), then Richard III

Events
 May – Robert St Lawrence, 3rd Baron Howth appointed Lord Chancellor of Ireland (died a few months later)

Deaths
Germyn Lynch, a well known Galway merchant.

References